Audrey Meadows ( Cotter, February 8, 1922 – February 3, 1996) was an American actress best known for her role as the deadpan housewife Alice Kramden on the 1950s American television comedy The Honeymooners. She was the younger sister of Hollywood leading lady Jayne Meadows.

Early life
Meadows was born Audrey Cotter in New York City in 1922, the youngest of four siblings.  There is considerable confusion concerning her year of birth and place of birth.

Her parents, the Rev. Francis James Meadows Cotter and his wife, the former Ida Miller Taylor, were Episcopal missionaries in Wuchang, Hubei, China, where her three elder siblings were born. Her older sister was actress Jayne Meadows, and she had two older brothers.  The family returned permanently to the United States in 1927.  Audrey attended high school at the Barrington School for Girls in Great Barrington, Massachusetts.

Career

The Honeymooners 
After high school, Meadows sang in the Broadway musical Top Banana before becoming a regular on television in The Bob and Ray Show.  She was then hired to play Alice on The Jackie Gleason Show after the actress who originated the role, Pert Kelton (who was 9 years older than Gleason), was forced to leave the show due to blacklisting (although the official reason given was that Kelton was suffering from a health problem).

When The Honeymooners became a half-hour situation comedy on CBS, Meadows (who was 6 years younger than Gleason) continued in the role. She then returned to play Alice after a long hiatus, when Gleason produced occasional Honeymooners specials in the 1970s.  Meadows had auditioned for Gleason and was initially turned down for being too chic and pretty to play Alice. Realizing that she needed to change her appearance, Meadows the next day submitted a photo of herself, one in which she looked much plainer.  Gleason changed his mind and she won the role of Alice. The character of Alice became more associated with Meadows than with the others who played her, and she reprised her role as Alice on other shows as well, both in a man-on-the-street interview for The Steve Allen Show (Steve Allen was her brother-in-law) and in a parody sketch on The Jack Benny Program.

Meadows was the only member of the Honeymooners cast to earn residuals after the "Classic 39" episodes of the show from 1955 to 1956 started airing in reruns. Her brother Edward, a lawyer, had inserted a clause into her original contract whereby she would be paid if the shows were re-broadcast, thus earning her millions of dollars.  When the "lost" Honeymooners episodes from the variety shows were later released, Joyce Randolph, who played Trixie Norton, received royalty payments.

Career outside The Honeymooners
Meadows appeared in a 1960 episode of Alfred Hitchcock Presents, titled "Mrs. Bixby and the Colonel's Coat", one of the 17 episodes in the 10-year series directed by Hitchcock himself, and a rare light-hearted one.

She appeared in feature films and appeared on Dean Martin's television variety shows and celebrity roasts. She starred in an episode of Wagon Train in the episode's titled role of Nancy Palmer. Years later Meadows returned to situation comedy, playing Ted Knight's mother-in-law in Too Close for Comfort (1982–85).

She guest-starred on The Red Skelton Show, made an appearance in an episode of Murder, She Wrote ("If the Frame Fits"), and made an appearance in an episode of The Simpsons ("Old Money"), wherein she voiced the role of Bea Simmons, Grampa Simpson's girlfriend. Her last work was an appearance on Dave's World, in which she played the mother of Kenny (Shadoe Stevens).

Personal life
In 1956 (during the run of The Honeymooners), she married a wealthy real estate man named Randolph Rouse. On August 24, 1961, Meadows married her second husband, Robert F. Six, president of Continental Airlines, in Honolulu, Hawaii. He died on October 6, 1986.

Banking and marketing career
Meadows served as director of the First National Bank of Denver for 11 years, the first woman to hold this position. For twenty years, from 1961 to 1981, she was an advisory director of Continental Airlines, where she was actively involved in marketing programs that included the designs of flight attendant and customer service agent uniforms, aircraft interiors, and Continental's exclusive "President's Club" airport club lounges.

Memoirs
In October 1994, Meadows published her memoirs, Love, Alice: My Life As A Honeymooner.

Illness and death
A smoker for many years, Meadows was diagnosed with lung cancer in 1995 and given a year to live.  She declined all but palliative treatment and died on February 3, 1996, just five days before her 74th birthday, after slipping into a coma at Cedars-Sinai Medical Center in Los Angeles.  She was interred in Holy Cross Cemetery, Culver City, next to her second husband.

Legacy
Meadows was portrayed by Kristen Dalton in Gleason, a 2002 television biopic about the life of her Honeymooners co-star Jackie Gleason.

Filmography

References

External links

 
 

1922 births
1996 deaths
20th-century American actresses
Actresses from Connecticut
Actresses from New York City
American film actresses
20th-century American memoirists
American television actresses
American women bankers
American bankers
Burials at Holy Cross Cemetery, Culver City
California Republicans
Connecticut Republicans
Outstanding Performance by a Supporting Actress in a Comedy Series Primetime Emmy Award winners
Deaths from lung cancer in California
People from Sharon, Connecticut
RCA Victor artists
20th-century American businesswomen
20th-century American businesspeople
American women memoirists
20th-century American Episcopalians